The National Telegraph and Post Office Building is a public building and landmark in the city of Neiva in the Huila Department. It was built in the early 1930s commissioned by Alfonso Araújo, the Colombian Minister of Public Works, during the presidencial term of Enrique Olaya Herrera.

The National Building was designed by the architect Alberto Wills Ferro influenced by Mudéjar Architecture and Art Deco. The building originally was used mainly as post office. Currently it is used by DIAN, the Colombian National Tax and Customs office.

References

Government buildings in Colombia
Buildings and structures in Huila Department